Thornville is a rural locality in the Toowoomba Region, Queensland, Australia. In the  Thornville had a population of 26 people.

Geography
The New England Highway passes through from east to north.

History 
Thornville State School opened on 3 May 1909 and closed on 7 February 1975.

In the  Thornville had a population of 26 people.

References 

Toowoomba Region
Localities in Queensland